Phoriospongia is a genus of sponges belonging to the family Chondropsidae.

The species of this genus are found in Malesia and Australia.

Species:

Phoriospongia arenifibrosa 
Phoriospongia argentea 
Phoriospongia canaliculata 
Phoriospongia carcinophila 
Phoriospongia flabellopalmata 
Phoriospongia levis 
Phoriospongia mammillata 
Phoriospongia mozambiquensis 
Phoriospongia papillosa 
Phoriospongia poni 
Phoriospongia reticulum 
Phoriospongia solida 
Phoriospongia squalida 
Phoriospongia syringiana

References

Sponges